Camperdown is a village in the metropolitan borough of North Tyneside, Tyne and Wear in North East England. Camperdown is just south of Burradon, and the two villages are closely linked.
Both villages had coal mines.

See also
 The Battle of Camperdown, a naval battle in 1797

References

Villages in Tyne and Wear
Metropolitan Borough of North Tyneside